Marie-Ève Janvier is a Canadian singer from Quebec, born in 1984 in Roxton Pond, Estrie, Quebec.

Biography
After taking part in the musical comedy Notre-Dame-de-Paris created by Luc Plamondon and Richard Cocciante when she was just 14, she played in Les Dix commandements at age 16. She had a lead role in musical Don Juan against the male lead role played by Jean-François Breau.

In 2007, she released her first sole self-titled album Marie-Ève Janvier with Mercury (Universal) France. The album was very successful and reached the Top 5 in Quebec Albums Chart.

In 2008, she toured Quebec with Jean-François Breau, her boyfriend. In the summer of 2009, they recorded their first joint album entitled Donner pour donner, followed in 2011 with a second joint album  La vie à deux. Their joint single "J'ai un problème", a cover of a 1973 Johnny Hallyday and Sylvie Vartan song, became a big hit for Marie-Ève Janvier and Jean-François Breau.

They both took part in a revival of Don Juan in February 2012 where Janvier played the role of Maria against Breau in the role of Don Juan. This was followed by joint promotional tour called La vie à deux tour in Quebec in Spring 2012.

On the March 3, 2016, having been a steady couple since 2004, Janvier and Breau welcomed their first child, Léa, into the world. Their second child, Laurence, was born on April 20, 2021.

In popular culture
In 2010, Janvier was part of the Ensemble pour Haïti French Canadian charity for aid for Haiti earthquake victims and performed in the charity concert and telethon

Awards
Joint
 2014: Five joint nominations for Marie-Ève Janvier / Jean-François Breau at Gala of ADISQ for "Best Group of Year", "Album of the Year - Best Sold", "Album of the Year - Reinterpretations", "Spectacle show of the year" all for Noël à deux and "TV Show of the Year - Music" for the programme .

Discography

Albums
Solo
2007: Marie-Ève Janvier
Marie-Eve Janvier and Jean-François Breau
2009: Donner pour donner
2011: La vie à deux
2013: Noël à deux
2014: Libre
2016: La route infinie
Featured in
1998: Princesse Sissi (Soundtrack)
2003: Brother Bear aka Mon frère l'ours (Soundtrack)
2003: Don Juan (Musical comedy)
2004: Don Juan (L'intégrale) (Musical comedy)

Singles
as duo Marie-Eve Janvier and Jean-François Breau
2011: "Tout pour être heureux" 
2011: "J'ai un problème" 
2012: "L'amour c'est comme l'été"

References

External links
 Marie-Ève Janvier Official website
 Marie-Ève Janvier et Jean-François Breau Official website

1984 births
Living people
People from Estrie
French-language singers of Canada
21st-century Canadian women singers